The CT postcode area, also known as the Canterbury postcode area, is a group of 21 postcode districts in South East England, within 13 post towns. These cover much of east Kent, including Canterbury, Dover, Folkestone, Birchington, Broadstairs, Deal, Herne Bay, Hythe, Margate, Ramsgate, Sandwich, Westgate-on-Sea and Whitstable.



Coverage
The approximate coverage of the postcode districts:

|-
! CT1
| CANTERBURY
| Canterbury (City centre, St Martins, Northgate and Sturry Road, South Canterbury, Thanington)
| Canterbury
|-
! CT2
| CANTERBURY
| Canterbury (Hales Place, London Road, St Stephen’s and Broad Oak Road, St Dunstans and Whitstable Road), Harbledown, Rough Common, Sturry, Fordwich, Blean, Tyler Hill, Broad Oak, Westbere
| Canterbury
|-
! CT3
| CANTERBURY
| Wingham, Hersden
| Canterbury, Dover
|-
! CT4
| CANTERBURY
| Canterbury (Nackington Road, Stuppington), Chartham, Bridge, Nackington, Lower Hardres, Patrixbourne, Bekesbourne, Chartham Hatch, Part of Harbledown and Rough Common
| Canterbury
|-
! CT5
| WHITSTABLE
| Whitstable, Seasalter, Tankerton, Chestfield, Swalecliffe, Yorkletts
| Canterbury
|-
! CT6
| HERNE BAY
| Herne Bay, Herne, Broomfield, Greenhill, Eddington, Beltinge, Reculver
| Canterbury
|-
! CT7
| BIRCHINGTON
| Birchington-on-Sea, St Nicholas-at-Wade, Sarre, Acol
| Thanet 
|-
! CT8
| WESTGATE-ON-SEA
| Westgate-on-Sea
| Thanet
|-
! CT9
| MARGATE
| Margate, Cliftonville, Birchington, Garlinge, Westbrook
| Thanet
|-
! CT10
| BROADSTAIRS
| Broadstairs, St Peter's
| Thanet
|-
! CT11
| RAMSGATE
| Ramsgate, Pegwell
| Thanet
|-
! CT12
| RAMSGATE
| Northwood, Minster-in-Thanet, Cliffsend, Monkton, Manston
| Thanet
|-
! CT13
| SANDWICH
| Sandwich, Eastry, Woodnesborough, Great Stonar, Richborough
| Dover
|-
! CT14
| DEAL
| Deal, Walmer, Kingsdown, Ringwould, Sholden, Great Mongeham, Worth, Ripple, Tilmanstone, Betteshanger
| Dover
|-
! CT15
| DOVER
| Alkham, Lydden, Eythorne, St Margaret's at Cliffe, Elvington
| Dover
|-
! CT16
| DOVER
| Dover (town centre and roughly east of A256), Whitfield, Temple Ewell
| Dover
|-
! CT17
| DOVER
| Dover (roughly west of A256), Tower Hamlets, River
| Dover
|-
! CT18
| FOLKESTONE
| Hawkinge, Lyminge, Etchinghill, Capel-le-Ferne, Densole, Newington
| Folkestone and Hythe, Dover
|-
! CT19
| FOLKESTONE
| Folkestone (north), Cheriton
| Folkestone and Hythe
|-
! CT20
| FOLKESTONE
| Folkestone (south), Sandgate
| Folkestone and Hythe
|-
! CT21
| HYTHE
| Hythe, Saltwood, Lympne, Postling, Newingreen, West Hythe, Westenhanger
| Folkestone and Hythe
|-
! style="background:#FFFFFF;"|CT50
| style="background:#FFFFFF;"|FOLKESTONE
| style="background:#FFFFFF;"|Saga Group
| style="background:#FFFFFF;"|non-geographic
|}

Map

See also
List of postcode areas in the United Kingdom
Postcode Address File

References

External links
Royal Mail's Postcode Address File
A quick introduction to Royal Mail's Postcode Address File (PAF)

Postcode areas covering South East England
City of Canterbury